Marshall R. Sanguinet House is located on 4729 Collinwood Avenue in Fort Worth, Texas, United States. It was added to the National Register of Historic Places on June 7, 1983. 
Called the dean of Fort Worth architects, Marshall R. Sanguinet helped design over 20 houses in the Arlington Heights area.  The house on Collinswood was built in 1894.  A dining room was added in 1906. He lived in the house until his death in 1936.  The Sanguinet family sold the house in 1952.

See also

National Register of Historic Places listings in Tarrant County, Texas
Recorded Texas Historic Landmarks in Tarrant County

References

External links

Houses in Fort Worth, Texas
Houses on the National Register of Historic Places in Texas
National Register of Historic Places in Fort Worth, Texas
Recorded Texas Historic Landmarks